New Hampshire's 1st congressional district covers parts of Southern New Hampshire and the eastern portion of the state. The district contains parts of Hillsborough, Rockingham, Merrimack, Grafton, and Belknap counties; and the entirety of Strafford and Carroll counties.

The district contains Manchester, New Hampshire's most populous city, and its immediate suburbs. Most of the district's population resides in Rockingham County, which includes much of the Seacoast Region. The northern part of the district in Belknap, Carroll, and Grafton counties are far more rural.

The district is home to the University of New Hampshire, the state's largest university. Some of the largest employers in the district are Fidelity Investments, J. Jill, Elliot Health System, and The University System of New Hampshire. It is represented in the United States House of Representatives by Democrat Chris Pappas.

History and composition

This district is competitive, with a Cook Partisan Voting Index of EVEN. , the district has changed hands in six of the last eight elections, with an incumbent losing re-election in five instances. Incumbent Democrat Chris Pappas achieved a notable feat by winning his 2020 re-election bid in this district.

The district (2022–) includes:
 all of Belknap County, except the town of Center Harbor and New Hampton
 all of Carroll County, except the towns of Sandwich, Jackson and Albany
 the communities of Bedford, Goffstown, Manchester, and Merrimack in Hillsborough County
 the town of Hooksett in Merrimack County
 all of Rockingham County, except the towns of Atkinson, Deerfield, Northwood, Salem, and Windham
 all of Strafford County

Election results from statewide races
Election results from presidential races:

Election results from statewide races:

List of members representing the district

Electoral history

2012

2014

2016

2018

2020

2022

Historical district boundaries

See also

New Hampshire's congressional districts
List of United States congressional districts

Notes

References

 Congressional Biographical Directory of the United States 1774–present

01
Belknap County, New Hampshire
Carroll County, New Hampshire
Hillsborough County, New Hampshire
Merrimack County, New Hampshire
Rockingham County, New Hampshire
Strafford County, New Hampshire